Nuclear Family is an American documentary miniseries directed and produced by Ry Russo-Young. It follows Russo-Young's mothers as an unexpected lawsuit sends shockwaves throughout their family's lives. It consisted of 3 episodes and premiered on September 26, 2021, on HBO.

Plot
Sandra Russo and Robin Young have two children, Ry and Cade, each through a different sperm donor. Initially the relationship with the donors was pleasant, until one of them sued for paternity and visitation rights.

Episodes

Production
Ry Russo-Young had wanted to tell her story of her childhood for many years, and initially wanted to make a narrative film about her experience, but instead decided to make a documentary. She initially decided against making a documentary, feeling it would be a "me-and-my problems movie". Russo-Young had been shooting footage of her family over the course of 15–20 years. Russo-Young and her editors went through footage of her childhood and material documenting the case. Because of Tom Steel's death, Russo-Young interviewed his friends and family, and his former legal team to explore his motivations for the lawsuit.

In August 2021, it was announced Russo-Young would direct a documentary series revolving around her family, with Liz Garbus set to executive produce under her Story Syndicate banner, with HBO set to distribute.

Release
It had its world premiere at the 2021 Telluride Film Festival on September 2, 2021.

Reception
On Rotten Tomatoes, the series holds an approval rating of 91% based on 11 reviews. On Metacritic, the series holds a rating of 83 out of 100, based on 6 critics, indicating "universal acclaim".

Accolades

References

External links
 

2020s American documentary television series
2020s American LGBT-related television series
2020s American television miniseries
Lesbian-related television shows
Television series about families
HBO documentary films
HBO original programming